Fingercuffs may refer to:

 Chinese finger trap, a practical joke device
 Thumbcuffs, restraint devices